Outwood Viaduct is a Grade II listed railway viaduct crossing the River Irwell in Radcliffe, Greater Manchester.  Following a period of disuse, it was restored and opened to the general public as a footpath.

History
The viaduct was built by contractors for the Manchester, Bury and Rossendale Railway, to carry trains across the River Irwell on the Clifton Junction to Bury line. The inaugural date for the timber structure was 25 September 1846. The superstructure was converted to cast iron in 1881 by Handyside and Company of Derby. The London, Midland and Scottish Railway replaced the timber decking in 1923.

The closest station was Radcliffe Bridge, heading southwest to Clifton the following station was Ringley Road.

Having been closed to railway traffic in 1966, it was restored and subsequently re-opened to the general public on 25 June 1999 by Sir William McAlpine, President of the Railway Heritage Trust.

See also

Listed buildings in Radcliffe, Greater Manchester

References

Bibliography

External links
East Lancashire Railway official site
Information on restoration of viaduct
News story from 1997 regarding restoration of viaduct
Images of England - image of viaduct

Grade II listed bridges in Greater Manchester
Railway viaducts in Greater Manchester
Pedestrian bridges in England
Bridges completed in 1846
Irwell Valley
Radcliffe, Greater Manchester